TRIL may refer to:

 TRIL (gene)
 TRIL, a former stock market symbol for Thomson Reuters on the London Stock Exchange until Thomson Reuters was delisted from that stock exchange

See also 
 Trill (disambiguation)
 Thrill (disambiguation)